Acronychia littoralis, commonly known as the scented acronychia, is a species of small tree that is endemic to eastern coastal Australia. It has simple, glabrous, elliptic to egg-shaped leaves, small groups of yellow flowers and egg-shaped to more or less spherical creamy-yellow fruit.

Description 

Taxonomy
Acronychia littoralis was first formally described in 1984 by Thomas Hartley and J.B. Williams in the journal Brunonia from specimens collected by J.B. Williams near Brunswick Heads in 1979.

Distribution and habitat
Scented acronychia grows in rainforest within  of the coast between Fraser Island in Queensland and Iluka in New South Wales.

Conservation status
This acronchyia is classified as "endangered" under the Australian Government Environment Protection and Biodiversity Conservation Act 1999, the New South Wales Government Biodiversity Conservation Act 2016 and the Queensland Government Nature Conservation Act 1992. The main threats to the species include inappropriate use of four-wheel drive vehicles, weed invasion and salt burn at exposed sites.

References

Gallery 

littoralis
Flora of New South Wales
Flora of Queensland
Plants described in 1984
Taxa named by Thomas Gordon Hartley
Taxa named by John Beaumont Williams